John Jameson (March 6, 1802 – January 24, 1857) was an American farmer, lawyer, and politician from Fulton, Missouri. He represented Missouri in the US House of Representatives.

Early life
Jameson was born in Mount Sterling, Kentucky in Montgomery County, Kentucky on March 6, 1802. His great uncle was Col. John Jameson and he was a second cousin (twice removed) to George Washington.

He attended the common schools, moved to Callaway County, Missouri in 1825, studied law, was admitted to the bar in 1826 and commenced practice in Fulton, Missouri. He owned slaves.

Career
He served as a captain in the militia during the Black Hawk War between April and August 1832.  He held several local offices including member of the Missouri House of Representatives from 1830 to 1836 and the Speaker of the Missouri House of Representatives from 1834 to 1836.

Jameson was elected as a Democrat to the 26th Congress and filled the vacancy that had been caused by the death of Albert G. Harrison. Serving from December 12, 1839 to March 3, 1841, he was not a candidate for renomination in 1840. In 1842, Jameson was again elected to the House and served the 28th Congress from March 1843 to March 3, 1845. He was not a candidate for renomination in 1844. Jameson was again elected to the 30th Congress and served from March 4, 1847 to March 3, 1849. He was not a candidate for renomination in 1848.

Later life

In 1855, as a lawyer, Jameson led the defense of a slave named Celia in what became an influential trial of a slave. He based his unsuccessful "defense on the premise that under Missouri law Celia possessed the same right to use deadly force to defend her honor as did white women."

In his later years, Jameson was a farmer and was ordained as a minister in the Christian Church.

Personal life
Jameson was married to Susan A. Harris (1814–1890), a daughter of Tyre Harris and Sarah (née Garland) Harris. Together, they were the parents of:

 John Harris Jameson (1838–1902), who married Mary E. Herndon (1842–1927), a daughter of Edward S. Herndon, in 1861.
 Elizabeth Jameson (1840–1902), who married Benjamin F. Rogers. After his death, she married Judge Richard Reid.
 Ollie Tom Jameson (1842–1863), who died unmarried.
 Sarah Tyre Jameson (1843–1863), who died two weeks before she was to marry Richard Reid of Montgomery County, Kentucky. Ten years after her death, Reid married her sister, Elizabeth.
 Malinda R. Jameson (1845–1909), who married Clare O. Atkinson (1838–1919), a director of the Callaway Bank in Fulton.

Jameson died in Fulton, Missouri on January 24, 1857, and was interred in the Jameson family cemetery near Fulton.

Descendants
Through his daughter Elizabeth, he was a grandfather of Richard Reid Rogers, the Military Governor of Panama Canal Zone under President Theodore Roosevelt. Richard's daughter, Elizabeth Reid Rogers, married into the German nobility and the House of Hesse, by marrying Prince Christian of Hesse-Philippsthal-Barchfeld, a son of Prince William, in 1915 and being titled Baroness von Barchfeld.

References

External links 

1802 births
1857 deaths
People from Mount Sterling, Kentucky
American people of Scottish descent
Democratic Party members of the United States House of Representatives from Missouri
Speakers of the Missouri House of Representatives
Missouri lawyers
American slave owners
People from Fulton, Missouri
19th-century American politicians
19th-century American lawyers
American people of the Black Hawk War
Military personnel from Missouri